Carlos Miguel V. Conceição (born 5 August 1979), is an Angola-born Portuguese filmmaker. Conceição is best known as the director of the films Name Above Title and Serpentarius as well as the short film Bad Bunny. Apart from directing, he is also a producer, screenwriter and sound designer.

Personal life
He was born on August 5, 1979 in Angola. In 2002, he obtained a degree in English, with specialization in Romantic literature. He later obtained another degree, this time in cinema, from the Lisbon Theatre and Film School in 2006.

Career
He started career in 2005 as a music video and art film producer. In 2013, he made the short Versailles, which was in competition in Locarno Festival, Curtas Vila do Conde and Mar Del Plata Festivals. His 2014 film Goodnight Cinderella had its premiere in the Critics' Week of the Cannes Film Festival. In 2017, his film Bad Bunny made the appearance again in Cannes. 

He released his maiden feature film Serpentarius in 2019. The film had its premiere at the Berlin International Film Festival and was later selected for the Viennale in 2019. The film received awards at several international film festivals including: Best First Feature Film at Doclisboa, New Visions Award for Best Feature in the Sicilia Queer filmfest, Honorable Mention of the International Feature Film Competition and Best Film Editing Award at the Madrid International Film Festival, Honorable Mention of the Feature Film Competition at the Festival du nouveau cinéma in Montreal, Best Director at Pontevedra. The film then won the Public award at the Burgas International Film Festival as well. The medium-length Name Above Title followed in late 2020 and got him the Best Director award at the prestigious Festival de Cine Europeo de Sevilla

Filmography

References

External links
 

Living people
Portuguese film directors
1979 births
Portuguese film producers
Angolan people of Portuguese descent
Angolan film directors